Chư Sê is a district (huyện) of Gia Lai province in the Central Highlands region of Vietnam.

As of 2003 the district had a population of 126,464. The district covers an area of 1,310 km². The district capital lies at Chư Sê.

References

Districts of Gia Lai province